The Fencing Competition at the 1955 Mediterranean Games was held in Barcelona, Spain.

Medalists

Medal table

References
1955 Mediterranean Games report at the International Committee of Mediterranean Games (CIJM) website
List of Olympians who won medals at the Mediterranean Games at Olympedia.org

M
Sports at the 1955 Mediterranean Games
1955
International fencing competitions hosted by Spain